Frank Wilbur "Spig" Wead (24 October 1895 – 15 November 1947) was a U.S. Navy aviator who helped promote United States Naval aviation from its inception through World War II. Commander Wead was a recognized authority on early aviation. Following a crippling spinal injury in 1926, Wead was placed on the retired list. In the 1930s, he became a screenwriter, becoming involved in more than 30 movies. He also published several books, short stories and magazine articles. During World War II, he returned to active duty. He initially worked in a planning role, but later undertook sea duty in the Pacific, where he saw action against the Japanese in 1943–44 before being placed on the retired list in mid-1945.

Early life and family background
Frank Wilbur Wead was born to Samuel De Forest Wead and Grace (Bestor) Wead on 24 October 1895, in Ward No. 5 of Peoria Township, Peoria, Illinois. Frank graduated from Peoria High School.

The Wead family had a strong background of service to the American nation. The Weads of Massachusetts were represented in one of the Committees of Safety established during the American Revolutionary War, and also as patriots in the Colonial Wars, forming part of the General Society of Colonial Wars during 1607–1763. The Connecticut Weads were also patriots of the American Revolutionary War. The Wead families were prominent in Illinois and Vermont in several fields during the 19th and 20th centuries: politics, law, education and as supporters of the Union during the American Civil War, during which one branch of the Wead lineage became actively involved with the United States Sanitary Commission.

Military career

Early years

On 16 July 1912, Frank Wilbur Wead (aged 16) was admitted into the United States Naval Academy as a member of the Class of 1916. His classmates included John D. Price, Ralph E. Davison and Calvin T. Durgin. The Class of 1916 graduated on 29 May 1916.

Following graduation from the Naval Academy and leave, Wead reported to his first sea-duty assignment, on 28 June 1916. He was a line officer with a date of rank as an ensign of 3 June 1916 and a precedence of 17 within his group of "running mates."

The ship reached Rio de Janeiro where, with several other officers, he departed Pittsburgh on 21 September. Wead was granted a temporary promotion to lieutenant on 15 October 1917. He was booked for passage to the Port of New York aboard , which departed Rio de Janeiro on 25 September and arrived in New York on 17 October. Wead reported to the Bureau of Navigation, Navy Department, for sea duty orders.

Wead reported aboard  to assist in preparing the vessel for war. USS Shawmut departed New York Harbor in June 1918, and for the remaining months of the war operated in the area of the North Sea Mine Barrage. Following the armistice with Germany, Wead returned stateside aboard Shawmut, arriving at the Boston Navy Yard, Massachusetts.

In February 1919, a kite-balloon division of six balloons was assigned to Shawmut and other ships. The ships participated in fleet exercises and, after seven weeks, returned to the United States after demonstrating the capability to operate without land-based support. With the knowledge that the Naval Aviation Division was seeking naval officers with a strong aptitude in naval engineering, having a desire to accept projects with a certain amount of risk, and with the combat-proven ability to lead naval personnel by example, Lieutenant Wead began the process for obtaining endorsements to his application to be nominated for flight training.

Naval aviation
Wead received a permanent promotion to lieutenant (junior grade) on 3 June 1919 (as of 1 January 1920, he remained in the temporary rank of lieutenant). In the late summer of 1919, Wead requested naval aviation flight training at Aeronautic Station Pensacola, Florida. His request was approved and he was assigned to Class 1 (the first class of regular officers sent to Pensacola after the commencement of World War I), on 15 September 1919. Wead reported to Pensacola and was billeted in a two-man room with Lieutenant (j.g.) Ralph Eugene Davison, a classmate at the Naval Academy. Wead was assigned to a training flight team with two other officers and former classmates, Lieutenants (j.g.) Robert Morse Farrar and Calvin T. Durgin. In addition to basic and advanced flight and navigation, the students were trained on a catapult installed on a barge at Pensacola. Wead was designated a United States Naval Aviator on 17 April 1920; his wife, Minnie "Min" Wead, pinned his golden wings to his uniform. He was promoted to lieutenant on 1 July 1920.

Wead began to promote Naval Aviation after World War I through air racing, speed competitions and several naval aviation articles he submitted for publishing in the United States Naval Institute Proceedings magazine. This competition, mainly against the United States Army Air Service (and its leading racer, Jimmy Doolittle), helped push U.S. military aviation forward. These competitions would give naval aviation a much-needed spotlight in the public eye. The public attention that it generated helped push Congress to fund the advancement of military aviation. After World War I he was a test pilot for the Navy.

Sea duty
On 21 April 1921, a newly promoted Lieutenant Frank Wead reported aboard , homeported at Naval Air Station North Island, San Diego, California. Aboard Aroostook, Wead was assigned aviation duties involving flying: Aeromarine 39-B (two-seater seaplane used as a "scout plane") and Felixstowe F5L (flying boat that carried a crew of four); reporting to Commander, U.S. Pacific Fleet Air Squadrons Captain Henry Varnum Butler, USN, and Executive Aide Lieutenant Commander Patrick N. L. Bellinger, USN.

Many changes were occurring within the naval aviation community. In the summer of 1921, Lieutenant Wead took part in the round-trip, long distance flight operation involving twelve F-5-L flying boats departing from NAS North Island to the Coco Solo Canal Zone and back. Additionally, Wead took part in tests involving dummy torpedoes dropped from F-5-L aircraft. Also, in accordance with an Act of Congress, United States Secretary of the Navy Edwin Denby issued orders for the establishment of a Bureau of Aeronautics to begin operations, 1 September 1921, with Rear Admiral William A. Moffett as chief of the bureau.

The experience gained aboard USS Aroostook involving F-5-L flying boats was instrumental in Wead being selected as commanding officer of Combat Squadron No. 3 (re-designated, Fighting Plane Squadron 3, on 17 June 1922), U.S. Pacific Fleet; he served in this capacity for over a year until the spring of 1923.

Naval aviation publicity and development
During the period of 1921–23, there was a great interest among state governors and congressional leaders to send Government aeroplanes to all parts of the country to participate in patriotic celebrations, municipal and state functions, conventions, air meets, including international air races. In an era of aeronautic cooperation and coordination with the taxpayers, the two services (United States Army Air Service headed by Major General Mason Patrick and the Bureau of Aeronautics headed by Rear Admiral Moffett) wholeheartedly approved at the 14th Annual Banquet of the Aero Club of America to compete for the Pulitzer Trophy (National Air Races), Mackay Army Trophy (Mackay Trophy), Collier Trophy, Wright Trophy, Larsen Efficiency Trophy, Curtiss Marine Trophy, Detroit Aviation Country Club Trophy, Liberty Engine Builders Trophy, Detroit News Aerial Mail Trophy, Inter-service Championship Meet, including the two foreign races – the Coupe Henri Deutsch de la Meurthe and the Coupe Jacques Schneider for seaplanes and flying boats.

In the spring of 1923, Wead reported to NAS Anacostia, Washington DC for shore duty assignment. Assigned to the Flight Division of the Bureau of Aeronautics. Lieutenant Wead worked closely with the Philadelphia Naval Aircraft Factory and three contractors (Curtiss Aeroplane and Motor Company, Wright Aeronautical, Glenn L. Martin Company) in the development of seaplane airframes and new engines, and testing the seaplanes in duration flights above the Potomac River. Based upon his experience and technical expertise, Wead submitted several articles for publication that pertained to known issues concerning aircraft design, power plant problems, and future naval aviation.

Seaplane racing and records broken
Wead traveled to East Cowes, Isle of Wight, Great Britain as part of a U.S. Navy team to participate in the Schneider Cup race. Wead had to withdraw because of problems with his aircraft, but his teammates, Lieutenants David Rittenhouse and Rutledge Irvine finished first and second, respectively on 28 September 1923.

During the period 22–23 June 1924 just off-shore of NAS Anacostia, Wead and Lieutenant John Dale Price, using a Curtiss CS-2 with a Wright T-3 Tornado engine, set new Class C seaplane records for distance (963.123 miles), duration (13 hours 23 minutes 15 seconds), and three speed records (73.41 mph for 500 kilometers, 74.27 mph for 1000 km, and 74.17 mph for 1500 km). Lieutenants Wead and Price set a newer record 11–12 July 1924, with new Class C seaplane records for distance (994.19 miles) and duration (14 hours 53 min 44 sec) using a CS-2 with a Wright Tornado engine.

San Francisco to Hawaii flight
Following his assignment at NAS Anacostia, Wead was assigned staff duty involving flying at NAS North Island where he served as Flag Lieutenant to the flight project commander at NAS North Island, Captain Stanford Elwood Moses, USN. On 28 October 1924, Wead was assigned to command VT Squadron 2. During 1924 and 1925, Wead was involved with the planning for the San Francisco to Hawaii endurance and navigation tests to comprise two Naval Aircraft Factory PN-9 flying boats, and one Boeing PB-1 flying boat.

In early April 1926, Wead received a naval message at his headquarters, NAS North Island, that he was selected for promotion to lieutenant commander; promoted ahead of his fellow naval aviators Class of 1916; and, one of the Navy's youngest squadron commanders.

In his book "All the Factors of Victory: Admiral Joseph Mason Reeves and The Origins of Carrier Airpower" (May 2003), Thomas Wildenberg provided an insight into the naval aviation tactical issues with which Reeves was involved and the part Wead played as commanding officer of VF-2 fighter squadron (comprising Vought VE-7SF "Bluebird", Boeing Model 15 naval variant FB-5, Curtiss Model 34D F6C-2 "Hawk"). Wead was preparing his squadron for the June 1926 tactical exercises aboard  up to his accident on 14 April 1926. Wildenberg identified Wead's replacement as Lieutenant Commander Frank Dechant Wagner, USN, who would further improve upon the training tactics devised by Wead, including developing new dive-bombing techniques.

Medical retirement
On 14 April 1926, Wead heard his daughter Marjorie crying. Rushing to her, he accidentally tripped, falling head first down a dark stairway, and fractured his neck. The injury resulted in paralysis. Wead was immediately taken to the U.S. Naval Hospital, Balboa Park (today's Naval Medical Center San Diego) where the Commandant of the U.S. Naval Hospital, Captain Raymond Spear, was briefed on Wead's condition and ordered him to be operated on.

According to an article written by a San Diego Union staff writer:

On 16 July 1926, while convalescing in the hospital, Wead was promoted to lieutenant commander. At the encouragement of his fellow naval officers, he put his writing skills to work and started sending manuscripts to book and magazine companies. During spring 1927, in the hope that his recovery was imminent and with the strong recommendation from Commander Marc A. Mitscher, Rear Admiral Moffett submitted Wead's name to Rear Admiral Richard H. Leigh, Commander, Bureau of Naval Personnel, recommending Wead to be the new squadron commander of VF-6B (previously, VF-2) with duty aboard USS Langley. However, Wead was placed on the retired list, 28 May 1928 with a residence of Los Angeles, California. He began his second career, screenplay writing, which subsequently occupied him throughout the 1930s and early 1940s.

World War II service
In the hours immediately following the attack on Pearl Harbor on 7 December 1941, from the library within his rented estate in Beverly Hills, Wead listened as bulletins interrupted regularly scheduled radio programs with updated details of the bombing. He also made a long-distance phone call to the Bureau of Aeronautics to speak with Rear Admiral John Henry Towers, requesting a recall to active duty. The phone call was followed up with a Western Union telegram to Captain Ralph Davison, USN.

It was a chance to serve his country, again. Wead flew from California and arrived at Naval Air Station Quonset Point where he worked as special aide to Captain Ralph Davison. Also, at NAS Quonset Point was Rear Admiral Calvin T. Durgin and his naval aide Captain John Madison "Johnny" Hoskins, USN. All these naval aviators communicated closely together in working out the details for the manning and training of carrier air groups for the newly commissioned aircraft carriers. With the approval from Davison, Wead was promoted to the temporary rank of commander in the US Naval Reserve, on 28 September 1942.

The story of Wead's sea-duty during World War II began in the air, flying from Port of San Francisco and landing at Honolulu Harbor aboard NC18605 Boeing 314 Clipper Dixie Clipper, arriving at Oahu Island on 21 November 1943. From the Port of Honolulu Wead reported to Commander in Chief Pacific Fleet Headquarters as head of the Plans Division for Commander, Air Force, Pacific Fleet, (now) Vice Admiral John Henry Towers. On the afternoon of 9 December 1943, Wead reported aboard Yorktown where he met with his old Naval Academy buddy Captain Joseph J. Clark, USN, skipper of Yorktown. Representing the Plans Division, Wead's orders aboard Yorktown were to monitor and report on carrier aviation combat operations, most especially obtaining first-hand knowledge in the ability of consolidated CVs in a task force to readily replace their lost/damaged aircraft with replacements from close-by CVLs.

Having completed an earlier successful operation, Yorktown (assigned to Task Group 58.1, commanded by Rear Admiral John W. Reeves, Jr., USN) departed Pearl Harbor with Wead aboard on 16 January 1944. Wead took part in the attack on Kwajalein Atoll during Operation Flintlock, an operation that involved four carrier groups. USS Yorktown then steamed to the newly established Pacific Fleet anchorage at Majuro Atoll, arriving about 4 February 1944. The commanding officer of Essex was Captain Ralph A. Ofstie, USN. While aboard Essex, Wead saw action against Truk Island (17–18 February), now called Chuuk, and against Saipan, Tinian, and Guam (23 February).

After these operations, Essex received orders for overhaul and Wead remained aboard Essex as it steamed to San Francisco Bay. The carrier arrived at Naval Air Station Alameda on or about 16 April 1944 for a much-needed overhaul. It was at NAS Alameda, aboard Essex (pier-side), that Wead was given an official send-off from active duty just prior to his retirement. Wead was relieved of active duty on 21 July 1944, and was processed through the Personnel Department at NAS Alameda receiving his discharge papers and a train ticket for Los Angeles, California. Wead was placed on the retired list on 11 May 1945 with the rank of commander.

Works

Naval
 "Naval Aviation Today," U.S. Naval Institute Proceedings, April 1924, Vol 50, No. 4

Short fiction
Following his release from Balboa Naval Hospital, Wead moved to a small home in Santa Monica where he wrote:

Books
 Professional questions and answers for naval officers, (Menasha, Wisconsin, George Banta Publishing Company, 1921)
 Airplane parts and maintenance, (Scranton, Pennsylvania, International Textbook Company, 1931)
 Wings for men, (New York, London, The Century Company, 1931)
 Types of aircraft and materials, (Scranton, Pa., International Textbook Company, 1931)
 History of aviation. Airplane details, with James Ross Allen (Scranton, Pennsylvania, International Textbook Company, 1935)
 Practical flying and meteorology, with James Ross Allen (Scranton, Pennsylvania, International Textbook Company, 1935)
 Dark Canyon, W. L. River and Frank Wead (Frederick A. Stokes Company, New York, 1935). 285 p.
 Our greatest story-teller; the story of talking pictures, (New York, T. Nelson and Sons, 1936)
 Gales, ice and men, a biography of the steam barkentine Bear, Frank W. Wead (New York, Dodd, Mead & Company, 1937)
 All about motion pictures, (Cambridge, England, published for the Orthological Institute by the Basic English Publishing Company, 1938?)

Stage writing

 Ceiling Zero

Screen writing
Frank A. Andrews's book Dirigible (New York: A. L. Burt Co. 1931), is based on the Columbia Pictures screenplay by Wead. Wead's publishers released another book in 1931. This was Wings For Men. Writing would become a second and even more important career for Wead, and a means of promoting naval aviation.

The injury to his neck left Wead with an ability to endure hours of pain sitting upright in a chair typing away on manuscripts for possible publication. Known to outsiders as being "belligerent, brave, eccentric visionary; a man of fanatical dedication...doomed to be alone", his love for his daughters and their well-being could not be matched. He sent his daughter Dorothea to attend the prestigious Smith College; she graduated with the Class of 1939. Thus, this Naval Academy grad and record-breaking naval pilot was able to succeed as a screenplay writer and to earn a comfortable income to support his daughters in their life-style and college education.

Wead's second unexpected career became far more important than his work as a pilot. His talent for writing grew during the years as a naval officer involved with the daily administrative papers, submitting detailed reports, completing flight schedules. One of his interests was reading stories and poetry written by Robert Louis Stevenson. Wead would later use the "Requiem" inscribed on Stevenson's tomb as script material for several screenplays, such as They Were Expendable, and screenplay writers Frank Fenton and William Wister Haines used the poem in the Metro-Goldwyn-Mayer film The Wings of Eagles.

The popularity of his pulp and magazine stories led Wead to Hollywood and the eventual friendship and collaboration with director John Ford.

Filmography

Death and legacy
Wead entered Santa Monica Hospital on 1 November 1947 for surgery and died on 15 November in Los Angeles, California. Admiral Calvin T. Durgin later described Wead as "a great man who did a remarkable job under very difficult circumstances."

Wead is buried in Springdale Cemetery and Mausoleum, Peoria, Illinois.

In 1957, John Wayne portrayed Wead in John Ford's film The Wings of Eagles.

Military awards and certifications
   Naval Aviator Badge
   Legion of Merit
   Mexican Service Medal
   World War I Victory Medal
   Asiatic-Pacific Campaign Medal
   World War II Victory Medal

Notes

References

External links

 
 
 
 Yahoo! Movies: Frank Wead
 Frank "Spig" Wead papers, Margaret Herrick Library, Academy of Motion Picture Arts and Sciences

1895 births
1947 deaths
United States Naval Academy alumni
United States Naval Aviators
American male screenwriters
Writers from Peoria, Illinois
Military personnel from Illinois
Aviators from Illinois
Recipients of the Legion of Merit
Writers from Santa Monica, California
American aviation record holders
Screenwriters from California
Screenwriters from Illinois
20th-century American male writers
20th-century American screenwriters